Doswell is an unincorporated community in Hanover County in the Central Region of the U.S. Commonwealth of Virginia. Originally called Hanover Junction, it was located on the Virginia Central Railroad (later, part of the C&O) at a crossing of the Richmond, Fredericksburg and Potomac Railroad, a north–south route. Both railroads are now owned by CSX Transportation, although the former Virginia Central line is leased to a short-line carrier, Buckingham Branch Railroad. The area near the Doswell train station is a popular train-watching site for railfans.

The name was changed to Doswell in the early 1890s in honor of Major Thomas Doswell (1823—90). The first Doswell in the area was James Doswell, a captain in the American Revolution. 

Formerly consisting primarily of farmland, Doswell currently has many residents who commute to jobs in Richmond.

Attractions

Kings Dominion, a major amusement park owned by Cedar Fair, and Meadow Event Park, home of the Virginia State Fair, are located in the vicinity of Doswell. There are also several historic sites in the area, such as Church Quarter and Sharp's Oakland which are listed on the National Register of Historic Places.

Major roads

  
 
 Verdon Road
 Doswell Road

Notable people
Mittie Frances Clarke Point (1850-1937), dime novelist
Triple Crown champion Secretariat (horse)  (born 1970)

References

External links

Hanover County Economic Development
C&O Piedmont Subdivision – Doswell

Unincorporated communities in Hanover County, Virginia
Unincorporated communities in Virginia